Bibliography of science fiction and fantasy writer Jack L. Chalker:

Series

The Saga of the Well World series

Midnight at the Well of Souls, Del Rey, 1977
Exiles at the Well of Souls, Del Rey, 1978
Quest for the Well of Souls, Del Rey, 1978
The Return of Nathan Brazil, Del Rey, 1980
Twilight at the Well of Souls, Del Rey, 1980
The Sea is Full of Stars, December 1999
Ghost of the Well of Souls, 2000

The Watchers at the Well series
Echoes of the Well of Souls, Del Rey, trade paperback, May 1993
Shadow of the Well of Souls, Del Rey, February 1994
Gods of the Well of Souls, Del Rey, 1994
The Watchers at the Well, Science Fiction Book Club (omnibus edition), 1994

The Four Lords of the Diamond series

Lilith: A Snake in the Grass, Del Rey, 1981
Cerberus: A Wolf in the Fold, Del Rey, 1982
Charon: A Dragon at the Gate, Del Rey, 1982
Medusa: A Tiger by the Tail, Del Rey, 1983
The Four Lords of the Diamond, The Science Fiction Book Club (omnibus edition), 1983

The Dancing Gods series
The River of Dancing Gods, Del Rey, 1984
Demons of the Dancing Gods, Del Rey, 1984
Vengeance of the Dancing Gods, Del Rey, July 1985
Songs of the Dancing Gods, Del Rey, August 1990
Horrors of the Dancing Gods, 1994
The Dancing Gods: Part One, Del Rey, November 1995. This is an omnibus volume containing The River of Dancing Gods and Demons of the Dancing Gods
The Dancing Gods II, Del Rey, September 1996. This is an omnibus volume containing Vengeance of the Dancing Gods and Songs of the Dancing Gods

The Soul Rider series
Spirits of Flux and Anchor, Tor Books, 1984 2nd in Chronology
Empires of Flux and Anchor, Tor Books, 1984 3rd in Chronology
Masters of Flux and Anchor, Tor Books, January 1985 4th in Chronology
The Birth of Flux and Anchor, Tor Books, 1985 1st in Chronology
Children of Flux and Anchor, Tor Books, September 1986 5th in Chronology

The Rings of the Master series
Lords of the Middle Dark, Del Rey Books, May 1986
Pirates of the Thunder, Del Rey Books, March 1987
Warriors of the Storm, Del Rey Books, August 1987
Masks of the Martyrs, Del Rey, February 1988

The G.O.D. Inc. series
The Labyrinth of Dreams, Tor Books, March 1987
The Shadow Dancers, Tor Books, July 1987
The Maze in the Mirror, Tor Books, January 1989

The Changewinds series
When the Changewinds Blow, Ace-Putnam's, September 1987
Riders of the Winds, Ace Books, May 1988
War of the Maelstrom, Ace-Putnam's, October 1988
Changewinds, Baen (omnibus edition), August 1996

The Quintara Marathon series
The Demons at Rainbow Bridge, Ace-Putnam's, hardcover, September 1989
The Run to Chaos Keep, Ace-Putnam's, May 1991
The Ninety Trillion Fausts (a.k.a. 90 Trillion Fausts), Ace-Putnam's, October 1991

The Wonderland Gambit series

The Cybernetic Walrus, Del Rey, trade pb in November 1995
The March Hare Network, 1996
The Hot-Wired Dodo, Del Rey, Feb. 1997

The Three Kings series
Balshazzar's Serpent, Baen Books 1999
Melchior's Fire, Baen Books, 2001
Kaspar's Box, 2003

Stand-alone novels
 A Jungle of Stars, Ballantine, Del Rey, 1976
 The Web of the Chozen, Del Rey, 1978
 And the Devil Will Drag You Under, Del Rey, 1979
 A War of Shadows, Ace: An Analog Book, 1979
 Dancers in the Afterglow, Del Rey, 1979, 1982
 The Devil's Voyage, Doubleday, 1981
 The Identity Matrix, Timescape: Pocket Books, 1982
 Downtiming the Night Side, Tor Books, May 1985
 The Messiah Choice, St. Martins - Blue Jay, May 1985
 The Red Tape War (with Mike Resnick and George Alec Effinger). Tor hardcover, April 1991
 Priam's Lens, Del Rey, 1997
 The Moreau Factor, Del Rey, Feb. 2000
 Chameleon (partially completed at time of death)

Collections and anthologies
 Dance Band on the Titanic, Del Rey Books, July 1988 (short stories)
 Hotel Andromeda (editor), Ace, 1994

Besides the short stories included in Dance Band on the Titanic, Chalker wrote at least one other short story:

 "And Now Falls the Cold, Cold Night".  Alternate Presidents, ed. Mike Resnick, Tor 1992.

Miscellaneous
 An Informal Biography of Scrooge McDuck. Baltimore: Mirage Press, 1974. .

References

 
Bibliographies by writer
Bibliographies of American writers
Science fiction bibliographies
Fantasy bibliographies